Chambers Branch is a stream in Bourbon County, Kansas, in the United States.

A pioneer settler gave Chambers Branch its name.

See also
List of rivers of Kansas

References

Rivers of Bourbon County, Kansas
Rivers of Kansas